George Leslie Cedric Westwell (1931-2001) was Archdeacon of Malta from 1985 to 1992.

Westwell was educated at Lichfield Theological College; and ordained in 1963. After  curacies in Rothwell and Armley  he held incumbencies at Otham and Maidstone.

He died on 22 June 2001.

Notes

Alumni of Lichfield Theological College
Archdeacons of Malta
20th-century Maltese Anglican priests
1931 births
2001 deaths
People from the Borough of Maidstone